is a district located in Tokushima Prefecture, Japan.

As of June 1, 2019, the district has an estimated population of 7,877 and a density of 40.4 persons per km2. The total area is 194.84 km2.

Towns and villages
Two mergers left Mima District with a town and a city:
 Tsurugi

Mergers
 March 1, 2005:
 The towns of Mima, Anabuki and Waki, and the village of Koyadaira merged to form the city of Mima (Mima City).
 The towns of Handa, Sadamitsu, and the village of Ichiu merged to form the town of Tsurugi.

Districts in Tokushima Prefecture